DeJonge and Co. v. Breuker & Kessler Co., 235 U.S. 33 (1914), was a United States Supreme Court case in which the Court held every instance of a copyrighted work must observe copyright notice formalities for the work to maintain copyright, even if the work appears multiple times on the same sheet of paper. Every copy of a copyrighted painting must bear the notice for the painting to maintain copyright.

References

External links
 

1914 in United States case law
United States copyright case law
United States Supreme Court cases
United States Supreme Court cases of the White Court